Uday Raj Chopra (born 5 January 1973) is an Indian actor and producer. He is the son of filmmaker Yash Chopra. He made his acting debut in the 2000 musical romantic drama Mohabbatein and featured in several other films including Mere Yaar Ki Shaadi Hai (2002), Dhoom (2004), Dhoom 2 (2006) and Dhoom 3 (2013).

Early life
His sister-in-law is the actress Rani Mukerji and his cousins are film director Karan Johar and film producer Vidhu Vinod Chopra. Chopra worked as an assistant director on a number of his father's and brother's films under the Yash Raj Films banner.

In July 2012, Chopra founded his own company, "Yomics", which creates comics based on Yash Raj Films.

Career 
In 1994, Chopra produced Yeh Dillagi starring Akshay Kumar, Kajol and Saif Ali Khan. He made his acting debut in the movie Mohabbatein. Chopra has mostly done films under his father's production house.

He starred in 2004 in the action thriller Dhoom and in its sequels Dhoom 2 and Dhoom 3, released in 2006 and 2013 respectively. Although praised for his performance as Ali Akbar Fateh Khan in the first instalment, a role he reprised in both the sequels, the sequels were met with mixed reviews.

In summer of 2011, He went to Los Angeles to join a production work shop in UCLA.

In 2014, Chopra produced two films. Grace of Monaco was the biography film about Grace Kelly starring Nicole Kidman in the leading role. He produced the Hollywood film The Longest Week, a comedy drama starring Olivia Wilde and Jason Bateman. It is the first project of Yash Raj Film's subsidiary Hollywood production house YRF Entertainment.

Filmography

Films

Television

Awards
Chopra received an Emmy Award nomination for Outstanding Television Movie for producing Grace of Monaco at the 67th Primetime Emmy Awards.

References

External links

 
 
 

Male actors from Mumbai
Indian male film actors
Indian male voice actors
Living people
Male actors in Hindi cinema
21st-century Indian male actors
1973 births
International Indian Film Academy Awards winners